Sean Mark Dyche (born 28 June 1971) is an English professional football manager and former player who is the manager of Premier League club Everton.

During his playing career, Dyche played as a centre-back, making his professional debut in 1990 and representing Chesterfield – whom he captained and scored for in an FA Cup semi-final. Other teams he has played for include Bristol City, Luton Town, Millwall, Watford and Northampton Town. He was promoted with three of his six clubs. After retiring as a player in 2007, he coached at Watford, including a stint as manager between June 2011 and July 2012.

After leaving Watford, Dyche signed for Burnley in October 2012. During his time there Dyche guided the club to two promotions to the Premier League in three seasons, the latter following relegation back to the Championship at the end of 2014–15. Following the relegation of AFC Bournemouth and their manager Eddie Howe at the end of the 2019–20 season, Dyche became the longest-serving manager in the Premier League. He was dismissed by Burnley in April 2022 after they had performed poorly throughout the season. Dyche joined Everton in January 2023.

Playing career
Dyche was a youth-team player at Nottingham Forest in the late 1980s, while Brian Clough was manager. He broke his leg early in his career, which Dyche claims held him back. It also left him with a permanent bend in his leg.

He left Forest in early 1990 without making a first-team appearance and signed for Chesterfield, where he later became captain. Dyche was part of the team that reached the FA Cup semi-finals in 1997. In the FA Cup semi-final against Middlesbrough he scored a penalty to put his side 2–0 up in an eventual 3–3 draw. Chesterfield lost the replay 3–0.

Dyche left Chesterfield for Bristol City in 1997, helping them win promotion to Division One in his first season. City were relegated the following season, during which Dyche spent time on loan at Luton Town. He moved to Millwall at the end of the campaign, where he won promotion to Division One in 2001 and came close to a Premier League place the following year, losing to eventual promotion winners Birmingham City in the play-offs. In 2002, he began a three-year spell at Watford where he was captain in his final season with the club.

He signed for Northampton Town in 2005, and was involved in their 2005–06 promotion from League Two. He fell out of favour after the appointment of Stuart Gray as manager and was released at the end of the 2006–07 season.

Managerial career

Watford
Having retired, following his release from Northampton, Dyche re-joined Watford as under-18s coach in 2007, and was promoted to assistant manager in July 2009 when Malky Mackay was appointed Watford manager. Mackay left to join Cardiff City in June 2011, and Dyche was promoted to manager. Watford finished the 2011–12 season in 11th place in the Football League Championship, the club's best finish for four years, but a change in club ownership led to his dismissal at the end of the season.

Burnley

Dyche joined the England national under-21 football team as a temporary member of the backroom staff in September 2012, but the following month became manager of Burnley, succeeding Eddie Howe, who had left the club to re-join AFC Bournemouth. Dyche was named Championship manager of the month for September 2013, and led Burnley to their best start to a season since they were founded in 1882. The team broke a number of long-standing club records, and won promotion to the Premier League, after a four-year absence. Their spell in the top flight lasted only a single season, as they were relegated with two games to spare. In February 2016, he signed a contract extension. He guided Burnley to the Premier League for a second time in the 2015–16 season, with promotion sealed following a 1–0 win over Queens Park Rangers at Turf Moor on 2 May.

In January 2018, Dyche signed a new contract with Burnley to remain as manager until the summer of 2022. He had guided Burnley to seventh place in the Premier League at the time of signing his contract, an impressive start to their second successive top-flight season after finishing 16th the season prior. The season ended with Europa League qualification for the first time for over half a century and secured their best finish to a top flight season since a sixth-placed finish back in 1974. Following qualification for Europe, 'The Princess Royal' pub was renamed 'The Royal Dyche' in honour of the Burnley manager.

On 15 April 2022, Dyche was dismissed by Burnley after being with the club for nine and a half years. At the time of his dismissal, the club was in the relegation zone, four points behind Everton, with eight games remaining. The decision to dismiss Dyche by the club's owners was widely criticised, with BBC writer Phil McNulty describing it as "blind panic" in their attempt to retain their Premier League status by appointing a new manager. Mike Jackson succeeded Dyche as caretaker manager for the rest of the season, with Burnley relegated after finishing in 18th on the final day of the season.

Everton
On 30 January 2023, Dyche was appointed manager of Premier League club Everton on a two-and-a-half year contract, replacing Frank Lampard.

In his first game in charge, Everton defeated league leaders Arsenal 1–0.

Personal life
Dyche was born in Kettering, Northamptonshire. His father was a management consultant at British Steel Corporation, working in Egypt, India, and Corby. He has two brothers. Dyche and his wife Jane have two children. Dyche's son, Max, plays professional football for Northampton Town. Growing up, Dyche was a Liverpool supporter.

Playing statistics

Managerial statistics

Honours

Player
Millwall
Football League Second Division: 2000–01

Manager
Burnley
Football League Championship: 2015–16

Individual
Premier League Manager of the Month: March 2018, February 2020
Football League Championship Manager of the Month: September 2013, October 2013, April 2014, February 2016

References

External links

1971 births
Living people
Sportspeople from Kettering
English footballers
Association football defenders
Nottingham Forest F.C. players
Chesterfield F.C. players
Bristol City F.C. players
Luton Town F.C. players
Millwall F.C. players
Watford F.C. players
Northampton Town F.C. players
English Football League players
English football managers
Watford F.C. non-playing staff
Watford F.C. managers
Burnley F.C. managers
Everton F.C. managers
English Football League managers
Premier League managers
Association football coaches